George L. Houghton (August 28, 1841 - February 25, 1917) was an American soldier who fought in the American Civil War. Houghton received his country's highest award for bravery during combat, the Medal of Honor. Houghton's medal was won for his actions at Elk River, Tennessee, where he led a party that saved a bridge, on July 2, 1863. He was honored with the award on March 27, 1900.

Houghton was born in Yarmouth County, Nova Scotia in Canada, and entered service in Brookfield, Illinois. He was buried in Orting, Washington.

Medal of Honor citation

See also
List of American Civil War Medal of Honor recipients: G–L

References

1841 births
1917 deaths
American Civil War recipients of the Medal of Honor
Canadian-born Medal of Honor recipients
Pre-Confederation Canadian emigrants to the United States
People from Yarmouth County
People from Orting, Washington
People of Illinois in the American Civil War
Union Army soldiers
United States Army Medal of Honor recipients